Gina, mentioned in the Amarna Letters, was a town in ancient Canaan. The citizens of Gina were responsible for the death of Labaya. The town was later known as Beth-Hagan and was probably located roughly on the spot of the modern town of Jenin.

Amarna letter Gina
Amarna letter 250 records the only mention of Gina. It explains (in passing) the recent killing of Labaya, and the resultant of dealing with his two sons.

An excerpt of the mostly complete 60-line letter:

See also
Mutbaal

References
Moran, William L. The Amarna Letters. Johns Hopkins University Press, 1987, 1992. (softcover)

Canaanite cities
Amarna letters locations
Former populated places in Southwest Asia